Zeda may refer to:

Companies
 Zeda Computers International Limited, a defunct American computer company

Places

Georgia
 Zeda Vardzia, an 11th-century Georgian Orthodox church located in the Aspindza Municipality in Samtskhe-Javakheti
 Zeda Tmogvi, a medieval Christian church in south Georgia
 Zeda Sakara, a community in the west of Georgia, about 40 km to the southeast of Kutaisi
 Zeda Uchkhubi, a village in the Ozurgeti Municipality of Guria in western Georgia
 Zeda Bakhvi, a village in the Ozurgeti Municipality of Guria in western Georgia
 Zeda Dzimiti, a village in the Ozurgeti Municipality of Guria in western Georgia

Italy
 Monte Zeda, a mountain in the Lepontine Alps belonging to the Province of Verbano-Cusio-Ossola

People
 Zeda Zhang, an American professional wrestler and former mixed martial artist
 Zeda Rosenberg, an American microbiologist and epidemiologist